The members of the 23rd General Assembly of Newfoundland were elected in the Newfoundland general election held in October 1913. The general assembly sat from 1914 to 1919.

The Newfoundland People's Party led by Edward P. Morris formed the government. The Liberal Party and the Fishermen's Protective Union joined in a coalition which sat in opposition to the government. In July 1917, a National Government was formed with Morris as leader; the cabinet contained representatives from all three parties. Morris resigned from the assembly in late December 1917 when he was named to the British House of Lords. William F. Lloyd became Premier and leader of the National Government in January 1918.

Because of World War I, the general election which would normally have occurred in 1917 was delayed by a year. In 1918, legislation was passed extending the life of the assembly by another year. The Lloyd government was brought down by a vote of no confidence in May 1919. Michael P. Cashin was asked by Governor Harris to form a government which remained in power until the general election scheduled later in 1919.

John R. Goodison served as speaker until 1918 when William J. Higgins succeeded Goodison as speaker.

Sir Walter Edward Davidson served as governor of Newfoundland until 1917. Sir Charles Alexander Harris succeeded Davidson as governor.

The Military Services Act was passed in May 1918 to allow for the conscription of unmarried men between the ages of 19 and 40 to replace losses from the Newfoundland Regiment during the first World War. However, the war ended before any of these new soldiers reached the front.

Members of the Assembly 
The following members were elected to the assembly in 1913:

Notes:

By-elections 
By-elections were held to replace members for various reasons:

Notes:

References 

Terms of the General Assembly of Newfoundland and Labrador